Aïman Maurer (born 25 September 2004) is a professional footballer who plays as an attacking midfielder for Clermont. Born in France, he is a youth international for Morocco.

Career
Maurer is a youth product of AF Garenne-Colombes, Paris Saint-Germain, Boulogne-Billancourt, and Red Star, before moving to the youth academy of Clermont in 2019. He signed his first professional contract with Clermont on 3 December 2022. He made his professional debut with Clermont as a starter in a 2–0 Ligue 1 loss to Monaco on 5 February 2023, and in doing so at the age of 18 and 4 months was their youngest ever professional debutant.

International career
Born in France, Maurer is of Moroccan descent. He represented the Morocco U18s at the 2022 Mediterranean Games where he helped them achieve third place.

References

External links
 
 
 FFF profile

2004 births
Living people
Sportspeople from Neuilly-sur-Seine
Moroccan footballers
Morocco youth international footballers
French footballers
French sportspeople of Moroccan descent
Clermont Foot players
Ligue 1 players
Championnat National 3 players
Association football midfielders